O Comércio da Póvoa de Varzim, founded in 1903, is one of the three main local newspapers of Póvoa de Varzim, Portugal. Unlike its rivals, Póvoa Semanário and A Voz da Póvoa, the paper is devoted to national and local news alike.

References

1903 establishments in Portugal
Mass media in Póvoa de Varzim
Newspapers published in Portugal
Portuguese-language newspapers
Publications established in 1903